Bharat Mata Mandir (meaning "Mother India Temple") is located on the Mahatma Gandhi Kashi Vidyapith campus in Varanasi, Uttar Pradesh, India. Instead of traditional statues of gods and goddesses, this temple has a huge map of undivided India carved in marble. This temple is dedicated to Bharat Mata and claims to be the only one of its kind in the world.

Construction

The Bharat Mata Mandir structure is built of stone. It has a statue of Bharat Mata built of marble, symbolizing undivided India. The temple houses a relief map of India also carved out of marble. The map depicts the mountains, plains and oceans up to scale.

Varanasi and Ujjain
Bharat Mata Mandir is situated on the campus of Mahatma Gandhi Kashi Vidyapith and is 1.5 kilometers south of Varanasi Junction railway station and six kilometers north of Benaras Hindu University.

There is a Bharat Mata Temple situated near Mahakaleshwar Jyotrilinga temple at Ujjain. It is a big temple with a statue of India .

See also
List of Hindu temples in Varanasi
Swami Satyamitranand

References

Hindu temples in Varanasi
Hindutva